Feza Gürsey Institute is a joint institute of Boğaziçi University and TÜBİTAK (Scientific and Technological Research Council of Turkey) on physics research, founded in 1983 by Erdal İnönü with the name Research Institute for Basic Sciences. It now continues as the Feza Gürsey Institute, having been renamed in honor of Feza Gürsey, a distinguished Turkish physicist. The institute is located within the Kandilli Campus of the Boğaziçi University in Istanbul, Turkey. Currently it hosts researchers in mathematics and theoretical physics.

External links
Feza Gürsey Institute, official website of the institute 

Physics institutes
Research institutes in Turkey
Scientific and Technological Research Council of Turkey
Boğaziçi University